A by-election to the French National Assembly was held in French Somaliland on 19 April 1959. Hassan Gouled Aptidon was elected as the territory's MP.

Results

References

French Somaliland
1959 in French Somaliland
Elections in Djibouti
By-elections to the National Assembly (France)
April 1959 events in Africa